The Detroit Film Critics Society Award for Best Documentary is an annual award given by the Detroit Film Critics Society.

History
It honors the best documentary film of that year since its inception in 2011 with the first winner being Errol Morris's Tabloid.

Winners
2011: Tabloid
 Into Eternity
 Into the Abyss
 Marwencol
 We Were Here
2012: Jiro Dreams of Sushi
 The House I Live In
 The Imposter
 The Queen of Versailles
 Searching for Sugar Man
2013: Stories We Tell
 Blackfish
 The Act of Killing
 The Square
 The Unknown Known
2014: Citizenfour
 Finding Vivian Maier
 Jodorowsky’s Dune
 Keep On Keepin’ On
 Life Itself
2015: Amy
 Best of Enemies
 Going Clear: Scientology and the Prison of Belief
 Listen to Me Marlon
 The Look of Silence
2016: O.J.: Made in America
 13th
 Gleason
 Life, Animated
 Tickled
 Weiner
2017: Jim and Andy: The Great Beyond
 The Defiant Ones
 Human Flow
 Kedi
 Step
 Strong Island
 Whose Streets?
2018: Three Identical Strangers
 Free Solo
 RBG
 Whitney
 Won't You Be My Neighbor?
2019: Apollo 11
 Amazing Grace
 Horror Noire: A History of Black Horror
 Knock Down the House
 Rolling Thunder Revue: A Bob Dylan Story by Martin Scorsese
2020: Dick Johnson Is Dead
 All In: The Fight for Democracy
 Boys State
 The Dissident
 Time

See also
Academy Award for Best Documentary Feature

References

Detroit Film Critics Society Awards
Lists of films by award
American documentary film awards
Awards established in 2011